Jamia Al-Karam, is an Islamic institution Islamic Studies College located in Eaton in 30-acre premises. The Darul Uloom is managed by Muhammad Imdad Hussain Pirzada.

History
In 1995, Jamia Al-Karam moved to its current location in Retford, Nottinghamshire, where its founder Shaykh Pirzada launched a new project, the Al-Karam Secondary School. This was a boarding school providing education up to GCSE level. The school had maintained level of education and results in a very fees which is affordable to many.

It imparts teaching of English, Maths and Science. In addition to providing the subjects of Arabic Language, Islamic Studies, and Urdu.

The institute has produced over 400 British Islamic scholars of whom 40 have further graduated from Al-Azhar University in Cairo, Egypt. The relationship between the two institutions goes back to 1951 when Justice Shaykh Muhammad Karam Shah al-Azhari, after who Jamia Al-Karam is named, began his studies at Al-Azhar University under the tutelage of the great scholars of Al-Azhar including Ahmad Zaki, Mustafa Shilbi and Muhammad Abu Zahra.

On Sunday 15 May 2011, the United Kingdom Branch of the World Association for Al-Azhar Graduates (WAAG) and the Al-Azhar Contact Office in Great Britain was inaugurated at Jamia Al-Karam. This was attended by Timothy Winter from the University of Cambridge and Cambridge Muslim College, Nazir Ahmed, Baron Ahmed, Fayyaz Gafour (COO, ARY Network) among others.

Gul Muhammed, Imam and Senior lecturer at Jamia al Karam, appealed ISIS to release British hostage Alan Henning and urged the militants to not commit the 'worst condemnable sin' against Islam.

Methodology
As per the vision of its founder it was founded to cater for the educational and social needs of British Muslims.

Jamia Al-Karam teaches Dars-e-Nizami course which is affiliated to the oldest seat of Islamic learning, Al-Azhar University. It has gained affiliation with the University of Al-Azhar, and graduates of Jamia Al-Karam are offered admission into the third year of the Al-Azhar University's BA degree courses. It has produced more than 60 Islamic scholars.

The institute manages an Al-Karam Nashid Group which performs Islamic songs on various occasions including at the time of Mawlid celebrations.

It serves as a center for dialogue between various communities. Robert Jenrick, British Conservative Party politician and Member of Parliament (MP) for Newark, visited Jamia Al Karam and appreciated the efforts of its founder.

See also
Cambridge Muslim College

References

External links

Muhammad Imdad Hussain Pirzada official website

Educational institutions established in 1985
Boys' schools in Nottinghamshire
Islamic schools in England
1985 establishments in England